Lee Chung-mi is South Korean actress, singer and model. She is best known for her roles in Endless Love, The Third Charm and Sweet Enemy.

Filmography

Television

Film

References

External links 
 
 
 

Living people
21st-century South Korean actresses
South Korean female models
South Korean television actresses
1990 births
South Korean women singers
South Korean film actresses